Midlothian High School is a public high school located in the city of Midlothian, Texas, and classified as a 5A school by the UIL. It is a part of the Midlothian Independent School District located in northwestern Ellis County and is the original high school in the district. A second school, Midlothian Heritage High School, opened in the district in 2014.  

In 2015, the school was rated "Met Standard" by the Texas Education Agency.

Athletics
The Midlothian Panthers compete in these sports - 

Volleyball, Cross Country, Football, Basketball, Wrestling, Powerlifting, Soccer, Golf, Tennis, Track, Baseball, Softball, Lacrosse, Swimming

State titles
Boys Cross Country - 
1985 (3A), 1986 (4A)

State finalist 
Baseball - 
1982 (3A)

References

External links
Midlothian ISD website

Schools in Ellis County, Texas
Public high schools in Texas
1907 establishments in Texas